The  was the tenth season of the Japan Football League, the third tier of the Japanese football league system.

Overview

It was contested by 18 teams. Honda FC won the championship.

ALO's Hokuriku and YKK AP, both based in Toyama merged before the season to become Kataller Toyama.

Fagiano Okayama, New Wave Kitakyushu and MIO Biwako Kusatsu were promoted from Regional leagues by the virtue of their placing in the Regional League promotion series.

New Wave Kitakyushu and Kataller Toyama were approved as J. League associate members at the annual meeting in January. Fagiano Okayama were approved back in 2007 when playing in Regional league. FC Ryukyu's application was declined.

Table

Results

Top scorers

Attendance

Promotion and relegation
No relegation has occurred. Machida Zelvia, V-Varen Nagasaki and Honda Lock were promoted to JFL from Regional leagues at the end of the season.

References

2008
3